Events in the year 1979 in the People's Republic of China.

Incumbents 
 Chairman of the Chinese Communist Party – Hua Guofeng
 Premier of the People's Republic of China – Hua Guofeng
 Chairman of the National People's Congress – Ye Jianying
 Chairman of the Chinese People's Political Consultative Conference – Deng Xiaoping
 Vice Premier of the People's Republic of China – Deng Xiaoping

Governors  
 Governor of Anhui Province – Wan Li then Zhang Jingfu 
 Governor of Fujian Province – Liao Zhigao then Ma Xingyuan 
 Governor of Gansu Province – Song Ping then Li Dengying 
 Governor of Guangdong Province – Wei Guoqing then Xi Zhongxun 
 Governor of Guizhou Province – Ma Li (until unknown)
 Governor of Hebei Province – Liu Zihou 
 Governor of Heilongjiang Province – Yang Yichen then Chen Lei 
 Governor of Henan Province – Duan Junyi then Liu Jie   
 Governor of Hubei Province – Chen Pixian then Han Ningfu 
 Governor of Hunan Province – Mao Zhiyong then Sun Guozhi 
 Governor of Jiangsu Province – Xu Jiatun then Hui Yuyu
 Governor of Jiangxi Province – Jiang Weiqing then Bai Dongcai
 Governor of Jilin Province – Wang Enmao 
 Governor of Liaoning Province – vacant
 Governor of Qinghai Province – Tan Qilong then Zhang Guosheng 
 Governor of Shaanxi Province – Wang Renzhong then Yu Mingtao 
 Governor of Shandong Province – Bai Rubing then Su Yiran 
 Governor of Shanxi Province – Wang Qian then Luo Guibo 
 Governor of Sichuan Province – Zhao Ziyang then Lu Dadong
 Governor of Yunnan Province – An Pingsheng then Liu Minghui 
 Governor of Zhejiang Province – Tie Ying then Li Fengping

Events

January
 January 1 — The United States broke diplomatic relations with Republic of China, and established diplomatic relations with the People's Republic of China.
 January - The One Child Policy is announced and implemented (est.)

February
 February 17 – The People's Republic of China invades northern Vietnam, launching the Sino-Vietnamese War.
 February 26 – The Chiang Kai-shek International Airport opens.

March
 March 5 – Zhuhai County was upgraded to Zhuhai City.
 March 14 – In China, a Hawker Siddeley Trident crashes into a factory near Beijing, killing at least 260.

September
September 27 – Stars Art Exhibition, the first independent art exhibition, takes place in Beihai Park, Beijing

Births
 February 9 – Zhang Ziyi, film actress
 March 5 – Tang Gonghong, Chinese weightlifter
 March 12 – Liu Xuan, Gymnast
 August 27 – Tian Liang, diver
 December 10 – Yang Jianping, archer

Deaths

 May 27 – Yao Zhe, People's Liberation Army lieutenant general (b. 1906)
 June 1 – Yang Zhongjian, vertebrate paleontologist (b. 1897)
 Zheng Xiaocang, writer, translator, and educator (b. 1892)

See also 
 1979 in Chinese film

References 

 
Years of the 20th century in China
China
1970s in China